Lazar Kujundžić-Klempa (: 1880 – May 25, 1905) was a Serbian Chetnik commander (vojvoda) who was active in Old Serbia and Macedonia.

Biography
He was born in Orahovac, near Prizren. He graduated from a teacher's college at the Orthodox seminary in Prizren. He was a teacher in Prizren and Kičevo. He wrote a report with data about the Islamization of Christian women and girls in the Kičevo region. Ever since 1902, he had been an advocate for the creation of a Serbian Chetnik Organization that would protect the Serb population of Poreč from being attacked by a VMRO company and Muslim looting gangs. After the Ilinden uprising, he took up the job of organizing the first Serbian troops and revolutionary committees. The money for the first company was given to him by the painter Nadežda Petrović, who in 1903 visited the devastated areas carrying humanitarian aid. On that occasion, Kujundžić met with Savatije Milošević and Vojislav Tankosić.

He participated in the Fight on Čelopek when the Chetniks destroyed the Turkish forces. After the fight, he did not want to flee into Serbia but continued to operate in Ottoman-occupied Old Serbia with commanders Savatije Milošević and Živojin Milovanović. On the Feast of the Ascension, his band appeared in Velika Hoča. They were received by Albanian Lanja Ukin who had given them his word (besa) that nothing would happen to them in his house, however, he immediately alarmed the Turks in Orahovac who surrounded them. They set the house on fire. The Chetniks shot back and sung Chetnik songs. The Turks brought Lazar's mother to recognize him for them, but she did not, in order to save her village and family.

During the Interwar period, he was hailed as a great hero.

In Serbian Literature
The heroic deaths of Kujundžić and Milošević inspired Milan Rakić to write a poem "At Gazi Mestan", 
and the stoic comportment of Lazar's mother moved Serbian Catholic Ivo Vojnović to write a play called "The Resurrection of Lazar" (Lazarevo Vaskrsenje) in 1913. Another poet and veteran Chetnik Milosav Jelić dedicated a poem to Lazar Kujunžić's mother -- Majka Kujundžića -- in his collection of poems, Srpski vijenac (Serbian Garland).

See also
 List of Chetnik voivodes

References

Sources

1880 births
1905 deaths
20th-century Serbian people
Serbian military leaders
Serbs from the Ottoman Empire
Kosovo Serbs
People from Orahovac
People from Kosovo vilayet
Chetniks of the Macedonian Struggle